Sheremet may refer to:

Sheremet, an East Slavic surname of Turkic origin
, a locality in Kosovo
, a locality in Turkey
Şeremet bey, Albanian military commander, see Battle of Ohrid

See also
Seremet
Szeremeta